Robert Urswyk (fl. 1379–1401) was an English politician.

Family
His daughter, Ellen, married Richard Molyneux, who was also an MP for Lancashire.

Career
He was a Member (MP) of the Parliament of England for Lancashire in 1379, September 1381, October 1382, November 1384, 1385, November 1390, 1391, 1393, 1394, 1395, January 1397, September 1397, 1399 and 1401.

References

14th-century births
15th-century deaths
English MPs 1379
English MPs 1381
English MPs October 1382
English MPs November 1384
English MPs 1385
English MPs November 1390
English MPs 1391
English MPs 1393
English MPs 1394
English MPs 1395
English MPs January 1397
English MPs September 1397
English MPs 1399
English MPs 1401
Members of the Parliament of England (pre-1707) for Lancashire